Thomas Koechlin (born 4 October 1991) is a Swiss slalom canoeist who has competed at the international level since 2012.

Koechlin won a silver medal in the C1 event at the 2017 European Championships in Tacen. He competed at the 2020 Summer Olympics, finishing in 13th place in the C1 event after being eliminated in the semifinal.

World Cup individual podiums

References

External links

 

Swiss male canoeists
Living people
1991 births
Canoeists at the 2020 Summer Olympics
Olympic canoeists of Switzerland